Habib Jemli or Habib Jomli (born 28 March 1959) is a Tunisian politician.

He was the Secretary of State to the Minister of Agriculture from 2011 to 2014. He is an independent but is close to Ennahdha. He was appointed in 2019 to become the Tunisian head of government. In 2020, his government failed to gain the confidence of the Assembly of the Representatives of the People, making him the first appointed head of government not to take office.

Biography
He is an agricultural engineer and holds a Master's degree in agricultural economics and in management of agricultural institutions. He is a specialist in agricultural development and business management and is the author of several studies and research in these fields.

Professionally, he worked in research units in the field of field crops as well as in the quality and development department at the Ministry of Agriculture, and also runs a private company.

Close to Ennahdha, he assumed the position of Secretary of State to the Minister of Agriculture, Mohamed Ben Salem, from 2011 to 2014.

On 15 November 2019, he was appointed head of government by President Kaïs Saïed. He presented his list of ministers on 2 January 2020. Although they were independent, some ministers were close to Ennahdha and Heart of Tunisia. On 10 January 2020, he failed to gain the confidence of the Assembly of the Representatives of the People.

Habib Jemli is the father of four children.

References

1959 births
Living people
Government ministers of Tunisia
People from Kairouan
21st-century Tunisian politicians
Tunisian engineers